William Henry Weston Jr. (1890–1978) was an American botanist, mycologist, and first president of the Mycological Society of America. Weston was known for his research in the fungal group known as the phycomycetes, particularly the pathogenic genus Sclerospora. His nickname was "Cap", an insider joke among mycologists referring to the cap the fruit body of fungi, or mushroom.  He received a BA from Dartmouth College in 1911, then received his MA in 1912 and PhD (under the supervision of Roland Thaxter) in 1915, both from Harvard University. He worked for the U.S. Department of Agriculture and at Western Reserve University, then became assistant professor of botany, professor of cryptogamic botany, and chairman of the botany department, all at Harvard. In 1962, he received the Civilian Distinguished Service Award from the United States Army for his work as a civilian consulting for the Quartermaster Corps. He was elected to fellow of the American Association for the Advancement of Science and American Academy of Arts and Sciences.

In 1979, the Mycological Society of America established the William H. Weston Award for Excellence in Teaching in his honor. The award is given each year to an outstanding undergraduate or graduate level teacher of mycology. Species named after Weston include Helicoma westonii and Septobasidium westonii.

References

1890 births
1978 deaths
American mycologists
Harvard University alumni
Dartmouth College alumni